The Minneapolis Sculpture Garden is an  park in Minneapolis, Minnesota, in the United States.
It is located near the Walker Art Center, which operates it in coordination with the Minneapolis Park and Recreation Board. It reopened June 10, 2017 after a reconstruction that resulted with the Walker and Sculpture Garden being unified as one 19-acre campus. It is one of the largest urban sculpture gardens in the country, with 40 permanent art installations and several other temporary pieces that are moved in and out periodically.

The park is located to the west of Loring Park and the Basilica of Saint Mary. 
The land was first purchased by the park board around the start of the 20th century, when it was known as "The Parade" because it had been used for military drills.  It became known as the Armory Gardens after park superintendent Theodore Wirth created a formal design that included a U.S. National Guard armory (Kenwood Armory) for Spanish War volunteers.

Working as a civic and cultural center, in 1913 a floral convention transformed the land into floral gardens, which it remained for the next 50 years.  In 1934, six years after the Walker Art Gallery opened across the street, the Armory was demolished for its instability, and a new Armory built in downtown Minneapolis, turning the Armory Gardens over to the Minneapolis Park Board. Since 1908 the area of today's Sculpture Garden and land to the west had been used for sport recreation via mildly-improved playing fields and the 1950 construction of the original Parade Stadium. In 1988, the Minneapolis Sculpture Garden opened, designed by Edward Larrabee Barnes and landscape architects Quinnel and Rothschild. Parade Stadium was demolished in 1990, two years later the Garden was expanded, adding . Michael Van Valkenburgh and Associates, Inc. designed the northward extension to complement the original space with a more open area that features a walkway and the  Alene Grossman Memorial Arbor.

The centerpiece of the garden is the Spoonbridge and Cherry (1985–1988) fountain designed by husband and wife Claes Oldenburg and Coosje van Bruggen.

A pedestrian bridge, the Irene Hixon Whitney Bridge (1987), designed by Siah Armajani, now crosses Hennepin Avenue, connecting the sculpture garden to Loring Park.

Notable Installations
 Spoonbridge and Cherry (Claes Oldenburg and Coosje van Bruggen)
 Hahn/Cock (Katharina Fritsch)
 Wind Chime (Pierre Huyghe)

References

External links

Parade Stadium, Minneapolis in MNopedia, the Minnesota Encyclopedia 
Minneapolis Sculpture Garden
Minneapolis Park & Recreation Board: Minneapolis Sculpture Garden
Walker Art Center

Sculpture gardens, trails and parks in the United States
Art museums and galleries in Minnesota
Museums in Minneapolis
Outdoor sculptures in Minnesota
Parks in Minneapolis
Art museums established in 1988
1988 establishments in Minnesota
Edward Larrabee Barnes buildings